Cycling competitions were staged at the Summer Universiades in 1983 and 2011 as an optional sport. In 1983, road cycling and track cycling events were competed. Mountain biking and BMX cycling disciplines were introduced in 2011.

Competitions

Medal table

Records

See also
World University Cycling Championship

External links
 Results of cycling events at the 1983 Universiade
 Results of cycling events at the 2011 Universiade

 
Sports at the Summer Universiade
Universiade